We're Only Human is a 1935 American drama film directed by James Flood from a screenplay by Rian James. Starring Preston Foster, Jane Wyatt, and James Gleason, it was released by RKO Radio Pictures on December 27, 1935.

Plot Summary
A police detective (Preston Foster) and his girlfriend (Jane Wyatt) try to catch an escaped gangster.

Development
The story was based on “Husk,” a short story by Thomas Walsh that was published in The Saturday Evening Post in the same year the movie was filmed.

References

Films directed by James Flood
1930s English-language films
1935 films
1935 drama films
American drama films
RKO Pictures films
American black-and-white films
1930s American films